This is a list of notable individuals associated with the American Goshen College, a private liberal arts college located in Goshen, Indiana. The list includes students, alumni, and faculty.

Academia and theology

Stephen Ainlay, 18th president of Union College (since 2006)
Harold S. Bender (class of 1918), former president, American Society of Church History and author of The Anabaptist Vision (1944)
Denise Konan (class of 1988) - Professor of Economics and Dean of the College of Social Sciences at the University of Hawaii at Manoa.
Alan Kreider (class of 1962), professor, writer and speaker
John W. Meyer (class of 1955), professor, sociologist
John Mark Ramseyer (class of 1976), Mitsubishi Professor of Japanese Legal Studies at the Harvard Law School
Emma Richards, first ordained female Mennonite minister
Said Sheikh Samatar (class of 1973), Somali scholar, historian and writer
 Rebecca Stoltzfus ( B.A. 1984 Chemistry), professor & vice provost at Cornell University
John Howard Yoder, Christian theologian, ethicist, and Biblical scholar best known for his radical Christian pacifism
Howard Zehr, "The Father of Restorative Justice"; assisted with the founding of a victim-offender reconciliation program

The arts

Abbie Adams, contemporary artist and illustrator
Ellah Wakatama Allfrey, OBE (class of 2008), editor and literary critic
Howard Dyck, Canadian conductor and radio broadcaster
Vance George, Grammy Award–winning choral director of the San Francisco Symphony Chorus (1982–2006)
Luke and Jesse Miller, members of the electronic jam band Lotus
Royce Salzman (class of 1950), co-founder of the Oregon Bach Festival
Sofia Samatar, professor, editor and writer
James C. Strouse, independent filmmaker, writer and director who wrote the comedy-drama film Lonesome Jim (2005) and directed the drama film Grace Is Gone (2007)
Rudy Wiebe, taught at Goshen College from 1963 to 1967

Politics 

 Allan Kauffman, mayor of Goshen, Indiana
Christine Kaufmann, member of the Montana House of Representatives
Tim Kauffman, mayor pro tem of Westminster, Colorado 
David Dale Reimer U. S. Ambassador to Mauritius and to the Seychelles. 

 Jesse B. Martin, Canadian bishop and peace activist
 Arthur L. Gilliom, 25th Indiana Attorney General

Popular culture 
Justin Yoder, first child with a disability to drive a soapbox in the All-American Soapbox Derby

Science, technology and medicine

David Bartel (class of 1982), biology professor at the Massachusetts Institute of Technology, member of the Whitehead Institute, investigator at the Howard Hughes Medical Institute
Philip A. Beachy, Gallo Professor of Developmental Biology at Stanford University
Roger N. Beachy, biologist and the founding president of the Donald Danforth Plant Science Center
O.J. Eigsti, Goshen College professor and developer of the seedless watermelon
Owen Gingerich, astronomy professor at Harvard University

Sports 

 Katie Sowers, first openly gay and first female coach in Super Bowl history
 Errick McCollum, professional basketball player
 Jason Booth, pitching coach for the University of Saint Francis baseball team and manager of the Hamilton Thunderbirds

Past presidents of the college

 Rebecca J. Stoltzfus, 2017–Present
 Kenneth Newbold (Interim President), 2017
 James E. Brenneman, 2006–17
 John D. Yordy (Interim President), 2004–06
 Shirley H. Showalter, 1997–2004
 Henry D. Weaver (Interim President), 1996
 Victor S. Stoltzfus, 1984–96
 J. Lawrence Burkholder, 1971–84
 Paul E. Mininger, 1954–70
 Carl Kreider (Acting President), 1950–51, 1970–71
 Ernest E. Miller, 1940–54
 Sanford C. Yoder, 1923–40
 Daniel Kauffman, 1922–23
 Irvin R. Detweiler (Acting President), 1920–22
 Henry Frank Reist, 1919–20
 George J. Lapp, 1918–19
 John E. Hartzler, 1913–18
 Noah E. Byers, 1901–13

Principals of the Elkhart Institute
(Elkhart Institute was the former name of Goshen College)

 Noah E. Byers, 1898–1903
 Willis E. Tower, 1895–98
 Reverend F. A. Hosmer, 1894–95

See also

 List of people from Indiana

References 

Lists of people by university or college in Indiana